WW domain binding protein 1-like (WBP1L) also known as outcome predictor in acute leukemia 1 (OPA1L) is a protein that in humans is encoded by the WBP1L gene.

References

Further reading